Megaleporinus is a genus of fish in the family Anostomidae native to South America.

Species
There are currently 10 recognized species in this genus:
 Megaleporinus brinco (Birindelli, Britski & Garavello, 2013) 
 Megaleporinus conirostris (Steindachner, 1875)
 Megaleporinus elongatus (Valenciennes, 1850) 
 Megaleporinus garmani (Borodin, 1929)
 Megaleporinus macrocephalus (Garavello & Britski, 1988)
 Megaleporinus muyscorum (Steindachner, 1900)
 Megaleporinus obtusidens (Valenciennes, 1837) 
 Megaleporinus piavussu (Britski, Birindelli & Garavello, 2012) 
 Megaleporinus reinhardti (Lütken, 1875)
 Megaleporinus trifasciatus (Steindachner, 1876)

References

Anostomidae
Fish of South America
Freshwater fish genera